Marcos César Morales Sarmiento (born 4 January 1976) is an Argentine former rower. He competed in the men's coxless pair event at the 2004 Summer Olympics.

Notes

References

External links
 

1976 births
Living people
Argentine male rowers
Olympic rowers of Argentina
Rowers at the 2004 Summer Olympics
Rowers from Buenos Aires
Pan American Games medalists in rowing
Pan American Games gold medalists for Argentina
Pan American Games silver medalists for Argentina
Rowers at the 1999 Pan American Games
Rowers at the 2003 Pan American Games
Medalists at the 1999 Pan American Games